Events from the year 1926 in Denmark.

Incumbents
 Monarch – Christian X
 Prime minister – Thorvald Stauning (until 14 December), Thomas Madsen-Mygdal

Events

Sports

Date unknown
 B 1903 wins their third Danish football championship by defeating B 1901 41 in the final of the 1925–26 Landsfodboldturneringen.

Births
 3 February – Verner Panton, architect, furniture designer (died 1998)
 8 February  Birgitte Reimer, film actress (died 2021)
 16 February – Arne Vodder, furniture designer (died 2009)
 18 May – Dirch Passer, actor (died 1980)
 15 December – Jørn Larsen, painter and sculptor (died 2004)

Deaths
 12 January – Roger Henrichsen, composer and pianist (born 1876)
 17 June – Viggo Lindstrøm, actor and theatre director (born 1858)
 24 June – Thomas Vilhelm Garde, naval officer, Greenland explorer (born 1859)
 27 August – Anthonore Christensen, painter (born 1849)

References

 
Denmark
Years of the 20th century in Denmark
1920s in Denmark
1926 in Europe